Mats Wilander was the defending champion but lost in the semifinals to Stefan Edberg.

Brad Gilbert won in the final 6–4, 2–6, 7–6 against Edberg.

Seeds

Draw

Finals

Top half

Section 1

Section 2

Bottom half

Section 3

Section 4

References
 1989 Cincinnati Open Draw

1989 Grand Prix (tennis)